Ivanovskoye is a rural locality (a selo) in Voskresenskoye Rural Settlement, Cherepovetsky District, Vologda Oblast, Russia. The population was 379 as of 2002. There are 4 streets.

Geography 
Staroye Zakharovo is the nearest rural locality.

References 

Rural localities in Cherepovetsky District